Cranium is a party game created by Whit Alexander and Richard Tait in 1998. Initially, Cranium was sold through Amazon.com and the Starbucks coffee chain, then-novel methods of distribution. After selling 44 million copies of Cranium and its sister titles, the game's manufacturer Cranium, Inc. was bought by Hasbro, Inc. for $77.5 million in 2008. Billed as "The Game for Your Whole Brain", Cranium includes a wide variety of activities, unlike many other party games. Giorgio Davanzo handles packaging and branding for the game, and the artwork is by cartoonist Gary Baseman.

Board

The board is laid out as a circuit, consisting of four equally split colored spaces. Each color corresponds to a question card category that players must pull from on their turn. The purple "Planet Cranium" space gives the team their choice of category. Red is "Fun Facts", green is "Act & Hum", blue is "Sketch & Sculpt" and yellow is "Word Puzzles".

Expansions and spinoffs
Booster Boxes: boxes of cards (and clay) sold separately from the game that contain a new deck of each type of card. , Booster Boxes 1 and 2 are available, along with a special New York edition pack.
Cadoo: a children's version of the game that has some elements of tic-tac-toe. Sold between October 2007 and January 2008, Cadoo units were recalled in January 2008 by the U.S. Consumer Product Safety Commission because "the surface paint on the die contains excessive levels of lead, violating the federal lead paint standard."
Conga: a version with a slightly older target audience than Cadoo.  Incorporates a musical timer of Cranium, designed for two or more players to play cooperatively.
Cranium Hullabaloo: a children's dancing game
Cranium Kabookii: a video game version available on the Wii platform.  Activities comprise a mixture of some from the original game and new games better suited for a video game environment.
Cranium Scribblish: played very much like the game of telephone.  Players start by drawing a caption card from the deck and must draw the caption, then pass to another player who captions what they believe the other person has drawn, then draw said caption.  Winners correctly guess which drawing started as their own.
Cranium The Family Fun Game: a game similar to the original Cranium with some minor changes.
Cranium Turbo Edition: a version of Cranium designed for a faster game.
Cranium Wow: a similar game to the original with new cards and activities from Cranium Turbo.
Cranium Pop 5: a pop-culture focused version released in 2006 where one team assigns the point value (ranked from 1–5) the other team will earn depending on how the other team guesses the clue (through acting, drawing, humming, sculpting, or using letter cubes).
Cranium Brain Breaks: 200 one-minute mini games.
Cranium SpongeBob SquarePants Edition
Cranium Partyland Park: Is a children's game by Vtech, and Vsmile
 Jam Pack Jam: a travel-themed twist on Buckaroo
 Cariboo: a children's game
 Balloon Lagoon: a children's game
 Bloom Bingo'''
 Cranium Zigity''

References

External links

 

Board games introduced in 1998
Party board games
Hasbro franchises
Hasbro games
Cross and circle games
Quiz games